Flestolol is a short-acting beta adrenergic receptor antagonist.

Synthesis

Acylation of glycidol (2) with the acid chloride 1 produces the ester 3. Reaction of that intermediate with amine 4, obtained by reaction of 1,1-dimethylethylenediamine with urea, gives flestolol (5).

References

Beta blockers
Fluoroarenes
Benzoate esters
Ureas